"Crashed" is the third U.S. rock single, (the fifth overall), from the band Daughtry's debut album. It was released only to U.S. rock stations on September 5, 2007. Upon its release the song got adds at those stations, along with some Alternative and Top 40 stations.

The song's release is like the release of "What I Want" in that while "Over You" was the mainstream third single, "Crashed" was the third single on U.S. rock stations.

Music video
Like "What I Want" it did not have an official video, since the band made one for the main third single, "Over You" instead.  It did however have an unofficial promo video that mixes black and white scenes of the band performing with clips from the ACC and SEC College Football season, which the song was used to open. This video can be viewed here.

Song usage and live performances
The song, as mentioned, has been used to open the ACC and SEC College Football season and has been the opening number for the band's shows. In the United States, it was used in the Lego Bionicle advertisements featuring sets named "Toa Mahri".<ref>

They recently performed the track at the Rock And Roll 400, as well as on Late Show with David Letterman.

Chart performance
The song debuted on the Mainstream Rock chart for the week of October 6, 2007 at number 35, and peaked at number 24 on the chart.

References

2006 songs
2007 singles
Daughtry (band) songs
Songs written by Chris Daughtry
Song recordings produced by Howard Benson
19 Recordings singles
RCA Records singles